Samson ben Pesah Ostropoli (died July 15, 1648), was a Polish rabbi from Ostropol who was martyred at Polonnoye, Volhynia, during the Khmelnytsky Uprising. When the Cossacks laid siege to Polonnoye, Samson, with 300 of his followers, arrayed in their shrouds and praying-shawls, went to the synagogue, and stood there praying until the enemy came and butchered them all.

Ostropoli was a noted kabalist. He was the author of a commentary (published by his nephew Pesaḥ at Zolkiev in 1709) on the kabalistic work Ḳarnayim. According to the author of Yewen Meẓulah, he wrote also a commentary on the Zohar, titled Machane Dan, in conformity with the cabalistic system of Isaac Luria, but this work has not been preserved. Other works of his are:

Dan Yadin, a commentary on an early cryptic kabalistic work called Sefer Karnayim.
A collection of all Rabbi Shimshon's known Torah commentaries called Nitzotzay Shimshon.
His most famous work is the Erev (eve of) Pesach Letter famous for the assurance of blessing to those that study it called 'Maamar Sod Eztba Elokim' (The Secret of The Finger of G-d) on the ten plagues in Egypt.
Which recently became available online in English and Hebrew (with comprehensive commentary).

See also
 Martyrdom in Judaism

Jewish Encyclopedia bibliography
Grätz, Gesch. x.57, 65, Leipzig, 1897;
Yewen Meẓulah, section Gezerah Deḳaḳ, Polonah;
Azulai, Shem ha-Gedolim, i.181, Wilna, 1852;
Gurland, Le-Korot ha-Gezerot, ii.25, vi.60 et seq.;
Fürst, Bibl. Jud. iii.357.

References

https://www.theyeshivaworld.com/news/promotions/1706120/r-shimshon-of-ostropolis-1599-1648-erev-pesach-segula-that-saved-lives.html

External links
Article on Rabbi Shimshon of Ostropli's famed 'Erev Pesach Letter' (Ma'amar Sod Etzba Elokim) https://www.theyeshivaworld.com/news/promotions/1706120/r-shimshon-of-ostropolis-1599-1648-erev-pesach-segula-that-saved-lives.html

A Kabbalistic Letter written by Rabbi Samson of Ostropoli traditionally read in Hassidic circles on the eve of Passover

1648 deaths
Jewish martyrs
Kabbalists
17th-century Polish rabbis
Bible commentators
Year of birth unknown
People from Khmelnytskyi Oblast